Andries Malan (born 20 October 1994) is a South African badminton player. In 2014, he competed at the Commonwealth Games in Glasgow, Scotland. In 2015, he won double titles at the All-Africa Games by winning men's and mixed doubles event.

Achievements

All-Africa Games 
Men's doubles

Mixed doubles

African Championships 
Men's doubles

Mixed doubles

BWF International Challenge/Series (16 titles, 9 runners-up) 
Men's singles

Men's doubles

Mixed doubles

  BWF International Challenge tournament
  BWF International Series tournament
  BWF Future Series tournament

References

External links 
 
 
 
 Profile at g2014results.thecgf.co

1994 births
Living people
People from Bellville, South Africa
South African male badminton players
Badminton players at the 2014 Commonwealth Games
Commonwealth Games competitors for South Africa
Competitors at the 2015 African Games
African Games gold medalists for South Africa
African Games silver medalists for South Africa
African Games medalists in badminton
Sportspeople from the Western Cape